Abderahmane Benamadi (born 3 July 1985) is an Algerian judoka.

Achievements

References

External links

 
 
 

1985 births
Living people
Algerian male judoka
Judoka at the 2016 Summer Olympics
Olympic judoka of Algeria
African Games gold medalists for Algeria
African Games medalists in judo
African Games silver medalists for Algeria
Mediterranean Games bronze medalists for Algeria
Mediterranean Games medalists in judo
Competitors at the 2007 All-Africa Games
Competitors at the 2011 All-Africa Games
Competitors at the 2015 African Games
Competitors at the 2005 Mediterranean Games
21st-century Algerian people
Competitors at the 2022 Mediterranean Games